Gabriela Haja (born 3 May 1965) is a Romanian luger. She competed in the women's singles event at the 1984 Winter Olympics.

References

1965 births
Living people
Romanian female lugers
Olympic lugers of Romania
Lugers at the 1984 Winter Olympics
People from Vatra Dornei